Michiel "M.C.A." van den Bos (born 23 May 1975) is a Dutch musician who composes primarily for Epic Games and Triumph Studios. He began composing on the Commodore 64 and Amiga before making the transition to composing professional soundtracks for video games such as Unreal, Unreal Tournament, Deus Ex, and the Overlord series. His most recent project is the soundtrack of Age of Wonders: Planetfall.

According to an interview, his influences are LTJ Bukem, John Williams, Jerry Goldsmith, Martin Galway, Underworld, Rob Hubbard, Jeroen Tel, Ben Daglish, Carcass, At the Gates, Insomnium, PFM and Artemis.

Van den Bos is also an active indie/alternative DJ.

Video game credits
 1998 – Unreal (and the mission pack, Return to Na Pali)
 1999 – Age of Wonders
 1999 – Unreal Tournament
 2000 – Deus Ex
 2007 – Overlord
 2007 – Overlord: Raising Hell
 2009 – Overlord: Dark Legend
 2009 – Overlord II
 2012 – Samurai Beatdown
 2014 – Age of Wonders III
 2016 – Voidrunner
 2019 - Age of Wonders: Planetfall
 Cancelled – Unreal Tournament

Discography
 2014 – Taking the Fifth
 2014 – Drifting Through Static
 2020 – Conspiravision: Deus Ex Remixed

References

External links
 
 Michiel van den Bos on YouTube
 Michiel van den Bos at The Mod Archive

1975 births
Living people
Video game composers
Tracker musicians
Dutch composers
Demosceners
Rock DJs
Musicians from Rotterdam
Dutch electronic musicians
Dutch drum and bass musicians
Dutch DJs
Electronic dance music DJs